Antopol may refer to:

Russian name for Antopal in present-day Belarus
Antopol, Łódź Voivodeship (central Poland)
Antopol, Puławy County in Lublin Voivodeship (east Poland)
Antopol, Gmina Podedwórze in Lublin Voivodeship (east Poland)